Malkishua is a drug rehabilitation centre in the form of a village in north-eastern Israel. Located on Mount Malkishua in the Gilboa, it falls under the jurisdiction of Valley of Springs Regional Council.

History
The centre was established by the National Authority for the War on Drugs and the regional council in 1990, and was named after Malkishua, the son of King Saul, who fell here in the Mount of Gilboa (1 Samuel 31:2). In 1995 a youth treatment facility was added, and in 2002, Kedem, a centre for religious youths, was founded. The centre is today run by "Amutat Neve Malkishua" under the authority of the Ministry of Welfare & Social Services.

Prior to the establishment of the centre, there had been a kibbutz, Meirav, on the mount. However, the kibbutz moved to its present location on Mount Avinadav in 1987.

References

External links
Official website

Drug and alcohol rehabilitation centers
Populated places established in 1990
Villages in Israel
Populated places in Northern District (Israel)
Addiction organizations in Israel
1990 establishments in Israel